The Cappello Alpino is the most distinctive feature of the Italian Army's Alpini troops uniform. The Alpini are light Infantry troops, specializing in mountain combat. Initially the Cappello was only issued to the Alpini, but soon the Cappello was adopted by the Alpini Corps' support units like Artillery, signals, engineers. Today the Cappello is issued to members of 15 Army regiments, 3 battalions and various high commands. Thanks to the black raven feather, which is carried on each Alpini soldiers Cappello, the Alpinis are known as Le Penne Nere ("The Black Feathers") in Italy. A nickname the Alpini quickly adopted for themselves.

History 
On June 7, 1883, the "Fiamme Verdi" (green flames) collar patches were introduced thus making the Alpini officially a specialty within the Italian infantry corps. At the same time the issuing of the Cappello Alpino began. At first the hat was a round black felt hat, nicknamed bombetta (bowler hat), but with the introduction of the new green-grey uniform in 1910 the hat was changed to the distinctive grey felt hat that is still retained today. The Cappello Alpino is made of grey felt a quarter of an inch thick. In the front the rim is flattened to protect the face from rain and snow. On the left and right side four small metal encrusted holes allow for an exchange of air. Around the lower half of the round top section a green-grey leather band and for officers a golden braid encompasses the Cappello. Inside the Cappello has a two-inch black leather band where Cappello and head meet.

Each Cappello carries symbols which identify the wearers rank, unit and specialization:

 the feather, symbolizing the Alpini Corps
 the fregio, a coat of arms indicating the regiment
 the nappina, a colored tuft denoting the battalion (later the specialization too)
 the rank insignia for non-commissioned and commissioned officers

Description

The feather 
Each soldier is issued with a black raven feather, which he will carry at all times on the Cappello Alpino. When in combat the feather will be placed on the left side of the helmet. Officers above the rank of captain originally wore a white eagle feather, which has been replaced in later years by a white goose feather. Non-commissioned officers and officers up to the rank of captain continue to carry a black eagle feather. The feather is approximately 10-12 inches long and is carried with a slight backward and inbound inclination on the left side of the Cappello.

The Fregio 
The fregio is a coat of arms indicating the wearer's regiment. It is black for soldiers, golden for officers; both variants are sewn to the front of the Cappello. Today, soldiers serving on a permanent basis are issued the golden variant of the fregio too. Each fregio carries an eagle with spread wings on top and below symbols, which indicate the wearer's regiments specialization (i.e. artillery regiment, logistics regiment,...) and at the center of the fregio a half-inch circle with the regiment's number.

The symbols indicating a regiment's specialization are:

 Alpini: eagle with spread wings, two blowing horns, crossed rifles
 Mountain Artillery: eagle with spread wings, two blowing horns, crossed cannons
 Engineers: eagle with spread wings, two blowing horns, crossed axes
 Sappers: eagle with spread wings, two blowing horns, a gladius short sword, a burning grenade, crossed axes
 Signals: eagle with spread wings, two blowing horns, round antenna, crossed axes and flashes of lightning
 Materials and Transport: eagle with spread wings above a spur gear with spread wings
 Medical officers: eagle with spread wings above a five-pointed star with the red cross symbol and crossed staff of Asclepius
 Medical troops: eagle with spread wings above a five-pointed star with the red cross symbol
 Alpini Generals: a stylized silver eagle with spread wings, holding a silver laurel wreath, with a central red shield inscribed with the silver letters "RI" (for Repubblica Italiana), all together on a ribbon of red cloth.

The Nappina

Description 

The nappina is a small piece of wood, on which a tuft of colored wool threads is sewn. The piece of wood contains a little hole, in which the feather is sheathed. Also a thin bended wire juts out from the wood to allow the nappina to be latched onto the left side of the Cappello Alpino. The nappina were first issued to distinguish between the battalions in an Alpini regiment:

  I battalion
  II battalion
  III battalion
  IV battalion and battalions not assigned to a regiment

The colors are the same as found on the Italian flag of the Kingdom of Italy. Soldiers of the Mountain Artillery units were issued a green tuft with a black patch in the middle onto which the number of their battery was written in yellow. Officers below the rank of general and non-commissioned officers wear a golden colored metal wrap and generals a silver colored metal wrap instead of the nappina. Later further nappinas were issued in various colors and forms.

Alpini 
For an overview of the nappinas of all Alpini battalions see the main article about the Alpini.

Today the following units continue to carry the nappina:

  Morbegno Battalion (5th Alpini Regiment), ''Feltre Battalion (7th Alpini Regiment)
  Tolmezzo Battalion (8th Alpini Regiment), Vicenza Battalion (9th Alpini Regiment), Aosta Battalion (Alpini Formation Centre)
  Saluzzo Battalion (2nd Alpini Regiment), Bassano Battalion (6th Alpini Regiment)
  Susa Battalion (3rd Alpini Regiment), L'Aquila'' Battalion (9th Alpini Regiment)

Other Alpini units 
The Alpini, not assigned to one of the traditional Alpini battalions, carry either a blue nappina or a blue nappina with a black roundel on which the type of superior unit is inscribed.

Artillery 
The Mountain Artillery units of the Alpine troops carry a green nappina with a black or yellow roundel on which the number of the battery or the type of superior unit is inscribed. The units in service, which carry an Artillery nappina, are the:
 1st Mountain Artillery Regiment
 2nd Mountain Artillery Regiment
 3rd Mountain Artillery Regiment

Engineers and Signals 
The Engineer and Signal units of the Alpine troops carry an amaranth nappina; units that supported the 4th Alpine Army Corps directly had "CA" in white inscribed on the nappina.

Logistic Services 
Military logistics units (Transport, Medical, Veterinary, Administrative, Commissariat and Maintenance units) carry a violet nappina; units that supported the 4th Alpine Army Corps directly had "CA" in white inscribed on the nappina.

No longer in use

Rank insignia 
Officers carry the grade displaying their rank on the left side of the Cappello Alpino. Instead of the nappina the feather is held in place by a silver or golden colored metal wrap. Non-commissioned officers and officers up to the rank of captain carry a brown eagle feather and officers starting with the rank of major carry a white goose feather, instead of the standard black raven feather.

References 

Military equipment of Italy

Hats
Military uniforms

it:Alpini#Il cappello